Rumours may refer to:
Rumor, a piece of purportedly true information that circulates without substantiating evidence
Rumours (album), an album by Fleetwood Mac
Rumours (TV series), a Canadian sitcom
"Rumours" (Glee), a 2011 episode of Glee
"Rumours", song by Damage from the album Since You've Been Gone
"Rumours", a song by Kings of Convenience from the 2021 album Peace or Love

See also
Rumor (disambiguation)